Unterer Hösbach is a small river of Bavaria, Germany. It flows into the Hösbach near the village Hösbach.

See also
List of rivers of Bavaria

Rivers of Bavaria
Rivers of Germany